772 Tanete is an asteroid from the asteroid belt. Since 2004 it has been observed in stellar occultation four times. Its size is best described by an ellipsoid measuring  x .

In 1984, a fly-by of 772 Tanete was considered for a Mariner Mark II rendezvous mission with the short period comet 22P/Kopff.

See also 
 List of Solar System objects by size

References

External links 
 
 

000772
Discoveries by Adam Massinger
Named minor planets
000772
19131219